Boul may refer to:

 Boul, a tributary of the Suceava in Suceava County
 Boul (Tazlău), a tributary of the Tazlău in Bacău County
 Jack Boul (born 1927), artist and teacher based in Washington, D.C.

See also 
 Bool (disambiguation)
 Boole (disambiguation)
 Boule (disambiguation)
 Pârâul Boului (disambiguation)
 Valea Boului (disambiguation)